Outlook or The Outlook may refer to:

Computing
 Microsoft Outlook, an e-mail and personal information management software product from Microsoft
 Outlook.com, a web mail service from Microsoft
 Outlook on the web, a suite of web applications by Microsoft for Outlook.com, Office 365, Exchange Server, and Exchange Online
 Outlook Express, an e-mail and news client bundled with earlier versions of Microsoft Windows

Places
 Outlook, Montana, a town in Montana, United States
 Outlook, Saskatchewan, a town in Saskatchewan, Canada
 Outlook, Washington, a town in Yakima Valley of Washington State
 Outlook Peak, a mountain on Axel Heiberg Island, Nunavut, Canada

Printed media

Media companies
 Outlook Media, a company that publishes Outlook Columbus, a GLBT magazine based in Columbus, Ohio

Magazines
 Outlook (Indian magazine), a weekly English language news magazine published in India
 Outlook (Jewish magazine), a left-leaning Canadian Jewish magazine founded in 1962
 Outlooks, a monthly gay magazine published in Canada
 The Outlook (British magazine), a political magazine published between 1898 and 1928
 The Outlook (New York City), a popular weekly magazine published in New York, 1870–1935
 The Outlook Magazine, a Chinese lifestyle magazine

Newspapers
 The Outlook (Gresham), a newspaper published in Gresham, Oregon
 The Outlook (Rathfriland), a newspaper published in Rathfriland, Northern Ireland

Other uses
 Outlook (1960 TV series), a Canadian television series
 Outlook (1966 TV series), Canadian short film television series
 Outlook (radio programme), a radio programme produced by BBC World Service
 Saturn Outlook, a "crossover" utility vehicle (CUV) made and marketed by General Motors Corporation